(163249) 2002 GT is an Apollo asteroid with an absolute magnitude of 18.26. It is a potentially hazardous asteroid as its orbit crosses that of Earth.

Description 

In 2011, NASA considered sending the unmanned spacecraft Deep Impact toward the asteroid with the aim of performing a flyby in 2020. It was uncertain whether Deep Impact carried sufficient fuel for this operation.

On 24 November 2011 and 4 October 2012, the space probe's thrusters were fired briefly for two trajectory correction maneuvers that targeted Deep Impact for an encounter with 2002 GT in 2020, possibly within a distance of no more than 400 kilometers. However, funding for the flyby mission was not guaranteed. In June 2013 the asteroid was observed in radar by the Arecibo Observatory.

However, on 8 August 2013 NASA lost communication with the spacecraft, and on 20 September 2013, NASA abandoned further attempts to contact the craft. According to A'Hearn, the most probable reason of software malfunction was a Y2K-like problem (at 11 August 2013 0:38:49 it was 232 deciseconds from 1 January 2000).

See also 
 List of minor planets and comets visited by spacecraft

References

External links 
 Arecibo data
 
 
 

163249
163249
163249
20020403